Farná is a village and municipality in the Levice District in the Nitra Region of Slovakia.

History
In historical records the village was first mentioned in 1156.

Geography
The village lies at an altitude of 159 metres and covers an area of 32.745 km². It has a population of about 1,440 people.

Ethnicity
The village is approximately 77% Magyar and 23% Slovak.

Facilities
The village has a public library a gym and a football pitch.

Genealogical resources

The records for genealogical research are available at the state archive "Statny Archiv in Nitra, Slovakia"

 Roman Catholic church records (births/marriages/deaths): 1731-1900 (parish A)
 Lutheran church records (births/marriages/deaths): 1785-1959 (parish B)
 Reformated church records (births/marriages/deaths): 1824-1955 (parish A)

See also
 List of municipalities and towns in Slovakia

External links
https://web.archive.org/web/20071217080336/http://www.statistics.sk/mosmis/eng/run.html
Surnames of living people in Farna

Villages and municipalities in Levice District